Sattleria angustispina is a moth in the family Gelechiidae. It was described by Pitkin and Sattler in 1991. It is found in the Pyrenees of France.

The length of the forewings is 8.1–9 mm for males and 5.3-6.2 mm for females. Adults are on wing from July to August.

References

Sattleria
Moths described in 1991